Schloß Holte-Stukenbrock is a city in the district of Gütersloh in the state of North Rhine-Westphalia, Germany. It is located near the Eggegebirge, approx. 15 km east of Gütersloh and 15 km south-east of Bielefeld. It is the source of the river Ems.
In 2004, the town celebrated its 850th Anniversary.

References